"If It's Love" is the first single released from Squeeze's eighth album, Frank. It reached number seven on the U.S. Modern Rock Tracks chart in 1989.

In 2010 the song was featured in a television advertisement for eHarmony.

Track listing
7" vinyl
 "If It's Love" (4:02)
 "Frank's Bag" (3:42)

12" vinyl and CD
 "If It's Love" (4:02)
 "Frank's Bag" (3:42)
 "Vanity Fair (piano version)" (3:08)

References

External links
Squeeze discography at Squeezenet

Squeeze (band) songs
1989 singles
Songs written by Glenn Tilbrook
Songs written by Chris Difford
1989 songs
A&M Records singles